Singles 2000 is the compilation album by a Japanese singer-songwriter Miyuki Nakajima, released in April 2002.

The album comprises all A-sides and B-Sides of her seven singles which were released from 1994 to 2000. Like its two predecessors each were released in 1987 and 1994, the songs appeared on Singles 2000 are listed reverse-chronologically. It includes three massive hit singles each of which sold over a million copies; "Between the Sky and You" (double A-Side with "Fight"), "Wanderer's Song", and "Earthly Stars (Unsung Heroes)" (double A-Side with "Headlight, Taillight") which had enjoyed unprecedented success on the Japanese Oricon chart at the time and finally climbed the number-one spot in 2003.

Singles 2000 gained favorable commercial success, debuted at the number-three on the Oricon albums chart and entered there for over a year.

Track listings
All songs written and composed by Miyuki Nakajima, arranged by Ichizo Seo (except "Fight!" was arranged by Takayuki Inoue)

Production
Producer: Miyuki Nakajima, Ichizo Seo (except "Fight!")
Mastering engineer: Tom Baker (at Precision Mastering, Los Angeles)
Mastering Coordinator 	Ruriko Duer (Los Angeles)
Photographer: Jin Tamura, Masahiko Yakou
Cover Design: Hirofumi Arai
DAD: Genichi Kawakami

Chart position

Footnotes: In November 2002, the Japanese Oricon Weekly Albums was expanded from the Top-100 to the Top-300.

Release history

References

2002 compilation albums
Miyuki Nakajima compilation albums